In 2010, there were 26 new This American Life episodes.

External links
This American Lifes radio archive for 2010

2010
This American Life
This American Life